Isma Rajasthal  is a Village Development Committee in Gulmi District in the Lumbini Zone of central Nepal. At the time of the 1991 Nepal census it had a population of 2974 persons living in 568 individual households. joitikhola rajasthal 1

References

External links
UN map of the municipalities of Gulmi District

Populated places in Gulmi District